Thomas Galley (4 August 1915 – 12 July 2000) was an English international footballer, who spent the majority of his league career with Wolverhampton Wanderers.

Career
Galley joined Wolverhampton Wanderers in 1933, signing professionally the following year before making his league debut on 5 January 1935 in a goalless draw at Sunderland.

He established himself in the second half of the 1935–36 season and the next campaign saw him score 16 times, his best-ever seasonal tally. A versatile attacker, he occupied many different positions over his 14-year stay at Molineux.

During the war, he served in France and Germany with the Royal Artillery, and guested for Aldershot, Leeds and Watford. Either side of the conflict, he was a regular player in the Wolves side, forming a prolific forward line with Dennis Westcott and appearing in the 1939 FA Cup Final and 1942 War Cup Final.

Galley won two England caps during his Wolves career, making a goalscoring debut against Norway on 14 May 1937, and winning a second and final cap three days later against Sweden.

He moved to Grimsby Town in November 1947, where he became captain, before later moving on to Kidderminster Harriers.

Honours
Wolverhampton Wanderers
FA Cup finalist: 1939

External links
 
 Official Wolves site profile

1915 births
2000 deaths
Military personnel from Staffordshire
People from Hednesford
English footballers
England international footballers
Association football forwards
English Football League players
Notts County F.C. players
Wolverhampton Wanderers F.C. players
Grimsby Town F.C. players
Kidderminster Harriers F.C. players
Leeds United F.C. wartime guest players
Aldershot F.C. wartime guest players
Watford F.C. wartime guest players
English Football League representative players
FA Cup Final players
British Army personnel of World War II
Royal Artillery personnel